Roger Federer defeated Rafael Nadal in the final, 6–4, 6–3 to win the singles tennis title at the 2017 Shanghai Masters. It was his second Shanghai Masters title and  27th Masters 1000 singles title overall.

Andy Murray was the defending champion, but did not participate due to a hip injury.

Seeds
The top eight seeds receive a bye into the second round.

Draw

Finals

Top half

Section 1

Section 2

Bottom half

Section 3

Section 4

Qualifying

Seeds

Qualifiers

Qualifying draw

First qualifier

Second qualifier

Third qualifier

Fourth qualifier

Fifth qualifier

Sixth qualifier

Seventh qualifier

References
 Main Draw
 Qualifying Draw

Singles